Horrible Histories: Spies is an exhibition created in 2013 as part of the Horrible Histories franchise. It focuses on the espionage used during the Second World War, and was originally put
on by the Imperial War Museum.

References

Horrible Histories exhibitions